The 1973 South African Open was a combined men's and women's tennis tournament played on outdoor hard courts in Johannesburg, South Africa that was part of the 1973 Commercial Union Assurance Grand Prix. It was the 70th edition of the tournament and was held from 14 November through 27 November 1973. Jimmy Connors and Chris Evert won the singles titles.

Finals

Men's singles
 Jimmy Connors defeated  Arthur Ashe 6–4, 7–6, 6–3

Women's singles
 Chris Evert defeated  Evonne Goolagong 6–3, 6–3

Men's doubles
 Arthur Ashe /  Tom Okker defeated  Lew Hoad /  Robert Maud 6–2, 4–6, 6–2, 6–4

Women's doubles
 Linky Boshoff /  Ilana Kloss defeated   Chris Evert /  Virginia Wade 7–6, 2–6, 6–1

References

South African Open
South African Open (tennis)
Open
Sports competitions in Johannesburg
1970s in Johannesburg
November 1973 sports events in Africa